Ernst Behmer (22 December 1875 – 26 February 1938) was a prolific German stage and film actor who appeared in more than a hundred films during the silent and early sound eras.

Behmer was born in Königsberg, East-Prussia, Germany (now Kaliningrad, Russia) and died in Berlin at age 62.

Selected filmography

 Ferdinand Lassalle (1918)
 The Enchanted Princess (1919)
 The Commandment of Love (1919)
 State Attorney Jordan (1919)
 Only a Servant (1919)
 Kri-Kri, the Duchess of Tarabac (1920)
 Kean (1921)
 The Story of a Maid (1921)
 The Golden Bullet (1921)
 The Homecoming of Odysseus (1922)
 A Woman, an Animal, a Diamond (1923)
 By Order of Pompadour (1924)
 The Girl with a Patron (1925)
 Children of No Importance (1926)
 The Armoured Vault (1926)
 Watch on the Rhine (1926)
 Love's Joys and Woes (1926)
 The Violet Eater (1926)
 Roses from the South (1926)
 Sister Veronika (1927)
 The Orlov (1927)
 The Catwalk (1927)
 The Blue Mouse (1928)
 The Beaver Coat (1928)
 The Last Night (1928)
 Panic (1928)
 Don Juan in a Girls' School (1928)
 Secret Police (1929)
 His Best Friend (1929)
 Mischievous Miss (1930)
 The Rhineland Girl (1930)
 The Immortal Vagabond (1930)
 The Blonde Nightingale (1930)
 Marriage in Name Only (1930)
 The Love Market (1930)
 A Student's Song of Heidelberg (1930)
 Hocuspocus (1930)
 The Tiger Murder Case (1930)
 Ein Walzer im Schlafcoupé (1930)
 Terror of the Garrison (1931)
 Who Takes Love Seriously? (1931)
 Berlin-Alexanderplatz (1931)
 Duty Is Duty (1931)
 Between Night and Dawn (1931)
 Student Life in Merry Springtime (1931)
 Without Meyer, No Celebration is Complete (1931)
 The Magic Top Hat (1932)
 Modern Dowry (1932)
 Chauffeur Antoinette (1932)
 Spoiling the Game (1932)
 A Blonde Dream (1932)
 The Blue of Heaven (1932)
 The Cheeky Devil (1932)
 The White Demon (1932)
 Two Hearts Beat as One (1932)
 Man Without a Name (1932)
 A Shot at Dawn (1932)
 Impossible Love (1932)
 Love Must Be Understood (1933)
 The Roberts Case (1933)
 Two Good Comrades (1933)
 The Gentleman from Maxim's (1933)
 Gretel Wins First Prize (1933)
 Inge and the Millions (1933)
 The Country Schoolmaster (1933)
 Hitlerjunge Quex (1933)
 The World Without a Mask (1934)
 Miss Liselott (1934)
 Love and the First Railway (1934)
 Music in the Blood (1934)
 The Girlfriend of a Big Man (1934)
 The Four Musketeers (1934)
 Holiday From Myself (1934)
 The Cousin from Nowhere (1934)
 What Am I Without You (1934)
 Police Report (1934)
 The Young Count (1935)
 Punks Arrives from America (1935)
 The Valley of Love (1935)
 City of Anatol (1936)
 Paul and Pauline (1936)
 Moscow-Shanghai (1936)
 The Czar's Courier (1936)
 The Three Around Christine (1936)
 Donogoo Tonka (1936)
 The Beggar Student (1936)
 The Traitor (1936)
 Gasparone (1937)
 Capers (1937)
 Dangerous Game (1937)
 Woman's Love—Woman's Suffering (1937)
 The Man Who Was Sherlock Holmes (1937)
 Seven Slaps (1937)
 Faded Melody (1938)
 Comrades at Sea (1938)
 The Marriage Swindler (1938)

Bibliography
 Rentschler, Eric. The Ministry of Illusion: Nazi Cinema and Its Afterlife. Harvard University Press, 1996.

External links

1875 births
1938 deaths
German male stage actors
German male film actors
German male silent film actors
Actors from Königsberg
People from the Province of Prussia
20th-century German male actors